Vision E or Vision-E may refer to:

 Roewe Vision-E, a 2017 Chinese compact electric SUV concept
 Škoda Vision E, a 2017 Czech compact electric SUV concept
 Mercedes-Benz V-ision e, a 2015 German electric minivan concept based on the Mercedes-Benz V-Class

See also
 Tata EVision, a 2018 Indian compact sedan concept